Spoon is the eighteenth studio album by Japanese singer Akina Nakamori and fourth studio album to be released during 1990's. It was released on 17 June 1998 under the Gauss Entertainment label. The album includes lead singles "Kisei (Never Forget)" and "Kon'ya, Nagareboshi". It was Nakamori's first album released under label This One from Gauss Entertainment.

The second album released in Gauss, Will (1999) was produced by chief of the Gauss Entertainment recording label, Kazuhiro Chiba. It's considered as an unofficial album, since it isn't included in the official website and it was produced without Nakamori's approval. In December 1998, on the special press-con, said about Nakamori's existence as a troublemaker, who shouldn't exist in the music industry. In the end of press-con was announced contract cancelation scheduled on the December 1999.

Promotion

Singles
It consists of two previously released singles.

Kisei: Never Forget is the thirty-fifth single written by Yasuhiro Suzu and arranged by Akira Senju. It was released on 12 February 1998. It was her first single to be released in that year. The single was promoted as a theme song to the japanese television drama Tsumetai Tsuki, in which Nakamori starred a main role for the first time in 6 years. The single was included in the compilation album Utahime Densetsu: 90's Best. The single debuted at number 19 on the Oricon Single Weekly Charts. in 2005, the single has received renewed arrangement in ballad compilation album Ballad Best: 25th Anniversary Selection.

Kon'ya, Nagareboshi is the thirty-sixth single written by Keiko Utsumi and 	Seriko Natsuno. It was released on 21 May 1998, it was her second single to be released in that year. The single was included in the compilation album Utahime Densetsu: 90's Best.  The single debuted at number 66 on the Oricon Single Weekly Charts.

Stage performances
The album tracks Your Birthday, Rakuen no Megami, Genwaku, Konya, Nagare Hoshi, Oishii Mizu and Akai Bara ga Yureta has been performed once in the live tour Spoon in 1998.

Arashi no Naka de and has been performed in live tour Spoon and acoustic live tour 21 Seiki no Tabidachi he in 2000.

Ame no Hi wa Ningyo has been performed only in acoustic live tour 21 Seiki no Tabidachi he.

Kisei (Never Forget) has been performed in the live tour Spoon, symphonic concert in 1998, acoustic live tour 21 Seiki no Tabidachi he and live tour Music Fiesta in 2002.

Chart performance
The album reached at number 17 on the Oricon Album Weekly Chart charted for the 3 consecutive weeks with the sales of 22,800 copies.

Track listing

References

1998 albums
Japanese-language albums
Akina Nakamori albums
Albums produced by Akina Nakamori